Draycott is a small hamlet in north Gloucestershire between Moreton-in-Marsh and Blockley, within Blockley civil parish. It is not mentioned in Domesday Book but was in existence by 1182.
Draycott has a green and each summer a barbecue is held there for the locals.

External links 

References in history of Blockley parish, at www.british-history.ac.uk (2007-05-23)
Brief reference at www.british-history.ac.uk
Location and picture at www.geograph.org.uk

Villages in Gloucestershire
Cotswold District